Jordan Joseph Terence Edwards (born 26 October 1999) is an English professional footballer who last played as a midfielder for League Two side Swindon Town.

Club career

Swindon Town
On 5 May 2018, Edwards made his professional debut for Swindon Town during their 3–0 home victory over Accrington Stanley, featuring for 81 minutes before being replaced by Timi Elšnik. Prior to his Swindon debut, Edwards spent time on trial at Championship side Norwich City in January 2018. Following his league debut, Edwards was rewarded with his first professional contract ahead of the 2018–19 campaign.

On 10 October 2018, Edwards joined Chippenham Town on a three-month loan. In January 2019, Edwards joined Marlow and scored his first goal in a 1–1 draw with Tooting & Mitcham United.

Career statistics

References

External links

1999 births
Living people
sportspeople from Reading, Berkshire
English footballers
Association football midfielders
Swindon Town F.C. players
Chippenham Town F.C. players
English Football League players
National League (English football) players